The Maronite League – ML (Arabic: الرابطة المارونية | Al-Rabitat al-Marouniyya) or Ligue Maronite in French is a private, non-profit and apolitical organization of Lebanese Christian Maronite notables, dedicated mainly to defend the independence and sovereignty of Lebanon in the cadre of a democratic and pluralistic society. The President of the Maronite League is the highest civic Maronite authority in Lebanon after the President of the republic and is empowered to speak for the Maronite community of Lebanon. The Maronite League is also the political wing of Bkerké, the ecclesiastical patriarchal authority in Lebanon. The current President of the Maronite League is the former President of the Lebanese Bar Association, Lawyer Antoine Klimos, elected in March 2016 in Beirut.

Composition
The League is often described as an exclusively Maronite "elitist group" whose membership was "automatic" for prominent figures in the public and private sector – Intellectuals, Businessmen, Bankers, Politicians (including former Heads of State, Members of Parliament, Government Ministers, and diplomats), Lawyers, Jurists, Public Servants, retired senior Army or Police officers, Presidents of Economic and Social Associations, Corporate Managers, and others. Only 60 new members are admitted each year. In reality, the League is a Phoenicianist-oriented lobby aimed at promoting Maronite Christian interests at the Lebanese Government and Parliament.

Structure and organization
The Maronite League is run by a council of seventeen elected senior members, the Executive Board, which is headed by an elected President and vice-president assisted by a general-secretary and a treasurer chosen from elected members of the council. There is a General Assembly, formed by all members of the League, which elects in a single session the President and the vice-President, the Executive Board, and the Admission's Committee. The President and the vice-president are elected for three years and the term is renewable one time. The Executive Board is elected on a separate ballot by the General Assembly also for three years, which is renewable one time. There are also twelve Permanent Committees, each one headed by a member of the Executive Board; these Committees can be increased or decreased in number by the Executive Board as the need arises. The Admission's Committee is elected by the General Assembly for one year, although the term is not renewable. Board meetings are held at the League's Headquarters, in the Central Council of the Maronite Societies Building located at Rue Medawar in Beirut.

Financing
Being a non-profit organization, its primary source of funding comes from annual membership fees paid by its affiliates as well as private donations.

List of ML presidents (1952-present)
Georges Tabet
HE Dr.Elias Khoury
Jean Abou Jaoudeh
Chaker Abou Sleiman
Ernest Karam
HE Pierre Helou
HE Michel Eddé
Emir Hares Chehab
Dr.Joseph Torbey
Emir Samir Abillama
H.E. Antoine Klimos

Members of the executive council 2007-2013

Joseph Torbey (President)
Abdallah Bou Habib (Vice-president)
Samir Hobeika (Secretary general)
Abdo Geries (Treasurer)
Emile Abi Nader
Fadi Abboud 
Badoui Abou Dib
Hikmat Abou Zeid
Fouad Aoun
François Bassil 
Alia Berty Zein
Antoine Boustany
Antoine Wakim
Charles El-Haj
Georges Hayek
Chawki Kazan
Antonio Andari

Members of the executive council 2013-2016

 Samir Abillama (President)
 Maurice Khawam (Vice-president)
 Fares Abi Nasr (Secretary general)
 Michel Comaty (Treasurer)
 Nada Abdel Sater
 Emile Abi Nader
 Laurent Aoun
 Carla Chehab
 Antoine Costantine
 Fadi Geries
 Ibrahim Jabbour
 Walid Joseph Khoury
 Bechara Karkafi 
 Souheil Matar
 Maroun Romanos
 Maroun Serhal
 Jihad Torbey

Members of the executive council 2016-2019

 Antoine Klimos (President)
 Toufic Moawad (Vice-president)
 Antoine Wakim (Secretary general)
 Abdo Geryes (Treasurer)
 Antoine Khoury
 Maroun Serhal
 Joseph Kreyker
 Souheil Matar
 Antoine Costantine
 Charbel Estéphan
 Alia Berty Zein
 Tina Ghazal Mallah
 Carla Milan Chehab
 Nada Andraos Aziz
 Joseph Nehmé
 Walid Khoury
 Georges Hajj

History
First established on August 21, 1952 in Beirut by a group of Christian notables and intellectuals with Georges Tabet being elected as president in their first General Assembly, the Maronite League became more politicised towards the 1960s, strengthening its ties with Maronite Church leaders. Politically conservative and anti-communist, being hostile towards Pan-Arabism and opposed to secularization, the group since the 1950s maneuvered to neutralize any measures that might threat the Christian-dominated political status quo, quietly exerting pressure on the authorities to lift legal bans on Maronite Church public activities or to restrict labor rights by curbing the Trade Unions. They also objected the presence of Palestinian refugees and the Palestine Liberation Organization (PLO) guerrilla factions, advocating their total eviction from Lebanon.

The Maronite League in the Lebanese Civil War 1975-1990
Under the presidency of Chaker Abou Sleiman, an ardent supporter of Father Charbel Qassis of the Order of Maronite Monks, the League in the early 1970s provided secret financial support and political cadres to the Christian militias, notably the Al-Tanzim led by the physician Dr. Fuad Chemali since 1972 (who, besides being the president of the Medical Association, was also a member of the executive board of the Maronite League and later a founding member of the Lebanese Front). In 1975 Abou Sleiman even used the League's funds to raise a 200 men-strong militia, which he led personally and saw heavy action in Beirut during the 1975-76 civil war, defending the Christian quarters against Lebanese National Movement (LNM)/PLO Joint Forces' attacks.
The League joined the Lebanese Front in 1976 and, despite having their own militia absorbed into the Lebanese Forces in the following year they managed to maintain themselves as a separate body. Remaining active – mostly behind the scenes – throughout the civil war, the League encouraged a rapprochement policy and reconciliation between the different Christian parties and militias during the violent inter-Christian strifes of the late 1970s and late 1980s.

The post-war years
Eventually, the ML emerged unscathed in the post-war years as a powerful pressure group with some 1,000-1,200 current members, which continues to promote Christian interests in Lebanon and abroad. Its current President is Antoine Klimos, former President of the Beirut Bar Association.

See also 
 Al-Tanzim
 Lebanese Civil War
 Lebanese Front
 Lebanese Forces
 Phoenicianism
 1958 Lebanon crisis

Notes

References 

 Alain Menargues, Les Secrets de la guerre du Liban: Du coup d'état de Béchir Gémayel aux massacres des camps palestiniens, Albin Michel, Paris 2004.  (in French)
Barry Rubin (editor), Lebanon: Liberation, Conflict, and Crisis, Middle East in Focus, Palgrave Macmillan, London 2009.  – 
 Denise Ammoun, Histoire du Liban contemporain: Tome 2 1943-1990, Fayard, Paris 2005.  (in French) – 
 Edgar O'Ballance, Civil War in Lebanon, 1975-92, Palgrave Macmillan, London 1998. 
 Jean Sarkis, Histoire de la guerre du Liban, Presses Universitaires de France - PUF, Paris 1993.  (in French)
 Rex Brynen, Sanctuary and Survival: the PLO in Lebanon, Boulder: Westview Press, Oxford 1990.  – 
 Robert Fisk, Pity the Nation: Lebanon at War, London: Oxford University Press, (3rd ed. 2001). 
 Samir Kassir, La Guerre du Liban: De la dissension nationale au conflit régional, Éditions Karthala/CERMOC, Paris 1994.  (in French)
 Marius Deeb, The Lebanese Civil War, Praeger Publishers Inc., New York 1980.

External links
Maronite League official site

Lebanese Civil War
Lebanese nationalism
Lebanese Maronites
Factions in the Lebanese Civil War